Being part of the Kingdom of Denmark, the foreign relations of Greenland are handled in cooperation with the Danish government and the Government of Greenland.

Unlike Denmark, Greenland is no longer part of the European Union. The country changed its status to an OCT associated to the EU, a dependent territory that has a special relationship with a member state of the EU. However, Greenland remains a full member of the Council of Europe and NATO.

General aspects of diplomatic relations 

With the Kingdom of Denmark having the responsibility for Greenland's international affairs, other countries often do not have direct diplomatic representation in Greenland—their embassies or consulates in Denmark are responsible for their relations with Greenland and their citizens in Greenland. Greenland is represented internationally by both the Greenland Representations and the embassies and consulates of Denmark. Further Greenland participates in the parliamentary Nordic Council and the Nordic Council of Ministers, and organisations as the West Nordic Council and the EU-based Overseas Countries and Territories Association, the latter being former colonies of the EU (dependent countries/territories). 

The United States reopened its consulate in Nuuk, closed in 1953, in June 2020.

Consulates General 
Nuuk, Greenland 
 (Consulate General)
 (Consulate General)

Honorary Consuls 
Nuuk, Greenland 
 (Honorary Consul)
 (Honorary Consul)
 (Honorary Consul)
 (Honorary Consul)
 (Honorary Consul)
 (Honorary Consul)
 (Honorary Consul)
 (Honorary Consul)
 (Honorary Consul)
 (Honorary Consul)
 (Honorary Consul)
 (Honorary Consul)
Tasiilaq, Greenland
 (Honorary Consul)
Qaqortoq, Greenland
 (Honorary Consul)

Diplomatic representations 
Greenland has representative offices in several countries and otherwise is represented by Embassies of Denmark worldwide. The Self-Government Act of 2009 allows the Government of Greenland to open diplomatic offices, mainly within areas of full jurisdiction of Greenland, this being foreign trade, industry, fisheries, education, science, mining etc. Further greenlandic diplomates, representing the Government of Greenland, participates in areas of shared responsibilities between Denmark and Greenland, this mainly being observed in the defence cooperation between the Kingdom of Denmark and the United States.

Current representations 

 Brussels (Representative Office)

 Copenhagen (Representative Office)

 Reykjavík (Representative Office)

 Washington, D.C. (Representative Office)

Beijing (Representative Office)

Planned representations 

 New York City (Representative Office)

Disputes – international 
 Qaanaaq (formerly Thule) is a sensitive area, due to the forced removal of the local population when establishing the base, handling of removal, compensation of the locals, later incidents aggravated the case.
 The dispute with Canada over Hans Island sovereignty in the Kennedy Channel between Canadian Ellesmere Island and Greenland was settled in 2022.

See also

 Greenland – European Union relations
 List of diplomatic missions in Greenland
 Politics of Greenland

External links
 Official website of the Department of Foreign Affairs of Greenland – Naalakkersuisut

References

 
Government of Greenland